The Egyptian Citizen Party was an Egyptian political party made up of former members of the NDP. It is led by former NDP secretary-general Mohamed Ragab; other former NDP members include Hamdi El-Sayed, Abdel Ahad Gamal El Din and Nabil Louka Bibawi.

References

Political parties established in 2011
2011 establishments in Egypt